Mountain Park is a town in Kiowa County, Oklahoma, United States. The population was 409 at the 2010 census, a 4.9 percent increase from 390 in 2000.

History
The town of Mountain Park began as a trading post named Burford, near the Wichita Mountains in southern Oklahoma Territory. A post office was established at Burford in August 1901, just after the Kiowa, Comanche, and Apache Reservation opened for settlement by non-Indians. In February 1902, the town that had sprung up around the trading post and changed its name to Mountain Park. Fires destroyed most of the wood-frame buildings along Main Street in 1906 and 1908. The town rebuilt with all brick structures.  

According to Encyclopedia of Oklahoma History and Culture, the Oklahoma City and Western Railroad offered Mountain Park resident Sol Bracken six thousand dollars for a  tract on which to build a station. Bracken refused the offer as insufficient and demanded more money. Instead, company officials rerouted their railroad through the town of Snyder, two miles south of Mountain Park. As a result, 41 of the 47 businesses in Mountain Park promptly moved to Snyder.

By statehood in 1907, Mountain Park had 381 residents. In 1910,  it was named the county seat of the short-lived Swanson County. That county was abolished in the following year. The local economy was based on cotton and wheat production, as well as granite quarrying. The population rose to 459 by 1930. Census population peaked at 557 in 1980, then declined to 390 in 2000.

On March 7, 2008, KSWO-TV reported that the former town clerk was fired for allegedly secretly embezzling $100,000 over a period of two years, leaving the town unable to pay its bills and forcing it to raise utility rates for residents.

Geography

Demographics

As of the census of 2000, there were 390 people, 174 households, and 103 families residing in the town. There were 210 housing units at an average density of 277.7 per square mile (106.7/km2). The racial makeup of the town was 90.00% White, 0.51% African American, 1.79% Native American, 0.26% Asian, 2.82% from other races, and 4.62% from two or more races. Hispanic or Latino of any race were 5.38% of the population.

There were 174 households, out of which 23.0% had children under the age of 18 living with them, 43.7% were married couples living together, 9.8% had a female householder with no husband present, and 40.8% were non-families. 35.6% of all households were made up of individuals, and 16.7% had someone living alone who was 65 years of age or older. The average household size was 2.24 and the average family size was 2.87.

In the town, the population was spread out, with 24.4% under the age of 18, 6.4% from 18 to 24, 23.1% from 25 to 44, 27.2% from 45 to 64, and 19.0% who were 65 years of age or older. The median age was 42 years. For every 100 females, there were 94.0 males. For every 100 females age 18 and over, there were 86.7 males.

The median income for a household in the town was $17,031, and the median income for a family was $19,375. Males had a median income of $23,750 versus $25,625 for females. The per capita income for the town was $9,584. About 29.4% of families and 36.5% of the population were below the poverty line, including 54.6% of those under age 18 and 22.9% of those age 65 or over.

Economy
Agriculture has supported the town economy since its inception.

References

 

Former county seats in Oklahoma
Towns in Kiowa County, Oklahoma
Towns in Oklahoma